Daniel du Preez (born 5 August 1995 in Durban, South Africa) is a South African rugby union player for the  in the English Premiership. His usual position is number eight, but he can also play as a lock or flanker.

Career

Youth

Du Preez was selected in a number of KwaZulu-Natal youth squads whilst still at school. At primary school level, he was selected for their squad that played at the 2008 Under-13 Craven Week competition. He also played in the premier schools competition in South Africa – the Under-18 Craven Week in three different seasons; he made two appearances at the 2011 event in Kimberley, three appearances at the 2012 event in Port Elizabeth – scoring a try in their match against the Free State – and a further three appearances in 2013, scoring a try against Border.

In both 2012 and 2013, Du Preez was selected to represent a South African Schools team. In 2012, he played in their matches against France and Wales and in 2013 he made appearances against England and Wales.

Sharks

He made his Super Rugby debut in the Sharks' 27–10 victory, coming on for the final ten minutes of the match.

South Africa Under-20

In 2014, he was selected in the South Africa Under-20 squad to play at the 2014 IRB Junior World Championship, but an injury ruled him out of the competition and was replaced by Jacques Vermeulen.

In March 2015, Du Preez was named in an extended South Africa Under-20 training group as part of their preparation for the 2015 World Rugby Under 20 Championship. He featured for them in a friendly match against a Varsity Cup Dream Team in April 2015. In May 2015, he was included in the South Africa Under-20 squad that toured Argentina. He started both of their tour matches, scoring a try in the 25–22 victory in the first encounter and was then included in the final squad for the 2015 World Rugby Under 20 Championship.

He played off the bench in the first of their three matches in Pool B of the competition, a 33–5 win against hosts Italy, started their 40–8 win against Samoa and again came on as a replacement in their 46–13 win over Australia to help South Africa finish top of Pool B to qualify for the semi-finals with the best record pool stage of all the teams in the competition. Du Preez came on in the second half of their semi-final match against England, but could not prevent them losing 20–28 to be eliminated from the competition by England for the second year in succession and started their third-place play-off match against France, scoring two tries in the match to help South Africa to a 31–18 win to secure third place in the competition.

Personal

Du Preez's father Robert is a former Springbok scrum-half that made seven appearances for South Africa between 1992 and 1993.

He has an older brother – also called Robert – and a twin brother Jean-Luc. Both of them also represented the South Africa Under-20 side at the IRB Junior World Championship, in 2013 and 2014 respectively.

References

1995 births
Living people
Rugby union flankers
Rugby union locks
Rugby union number eights
Rugby union players from Durban
Sharks (Currie Cup) players
Sharks (rugby union) players
South Africa international rugby union players
South Africa Under-20 international rugby union players
South African rugby union players
South African twins
Twin sportspeople
Alumni of Kearsney College
South African expatriate sportspeople in England
Expatriate rugby union players in England
South African expatriate rugby union players